The siege of Deeg (11–24 December 1804) was a siege of the main fort at Deeg, now in the Bharatpur district of Rajasthan, India, then within the Bharatpur Kingdom.  Forces of the British East India Company, led by General Lake, captured the fort from its Marathan defenders.

The siege started on 20 November, the bombardment on 13 December, and a breach made at Shahburz, a salient on the southwest side of the fort, on 23 December.  A three-pronged attack took place that night and the Marathas retreated to Bharatpur on the 24th.  The British suffered 227 casualties.

See also
Battle of Deeg

References

MacFarlane, Charles. A history of British India: from the earliest English intercourse to the present time

Deeg
Deeg 1804 12
1804 in India
Deeg
Deeg 1804 12
Deeg 1804 12
History of Bharatpur, Rajasthan
December 1804 events